The 2017 Charlotte 49ers football team represented the University of North Carolina at Charlotte (also called Charlotte or UNC Charlotte) in the 2017 NCAA Division I FBS football season, the school's fifth season of NCAA football, their third season of NCAA Division I Football Bowl Subdivision (FBS) play, and their third season as a member of Conference USA's East Division. The team was led by fifth-year head coach Brad Lambert and played its home games on campus at Jerry Richardson Stadium in Charlotte, North Carolina. The 49ers finished the season 1–11, 1–7 in C-USA play to finish in last place in the East Division.

Previous season 
The 49ers finished the 2016 season 4–8, 3–5 in C-USA play to finish in fifth place in the East Division.

Coaching staff
Tight Ends and Assistant head coach Dean Hood left the program in February to take over coaching Special Teams and Outside Linebackers for the Kentucky Wildcats. Recruiting Coordinator and Wide Receivers Coach Joe Tereshinski also resigned in February to pursue a non-football related career. Recruiting Coordinator responsibilities were transferred to Outside Linebackers Coach Ulrich Edmonds. Former Oklahoma State Offensive Line Coach Greg Adkins joined the staff in the same position in February. Previous Offensive Line Coach Johnson Richardson moved back to his former position as Tight Ends Coach. Catawba College Defensive coordinator and Assistant head coach Keith Henry joined the staff as Running Backs Coach. Previous Running Backs Coach Damien Gray moved to take over Wide Receivers. Defensive Line Coach Aaron Curry left the program in June to pursue a non-football related career. Charlie Skalaski, former Assistant head coach at Eastern Kentucky, was promoted to Special Teams Coordinator after having served on the Analytics Staff the previous season. Head Coach Brad Lambert will now directly coach the Defensive linemen.

Recruiting

Position key

Recruiting class

The following recruits and transfers have signed letters of intent or verbally committed to the Charlotte 49ers football program for the 2017 recruiting year.

Players

Player gameday honors

Roster

Awards and honors

Preseason

Post-season

Depth chart

Schedule

Schedule Source:

Television

Charlotte 49ers home games and conference road games will be broadcast through Conference USA's television partners ESPN, CBS Sports, Stadium, beIN, and Facebook Watch. Additional games will be available locally in the Charlotte TV market on WCCB.

Radio

Radio coverage for all games is broadcast by IMG College through the Charlotte 49ers Radio Network flagship station WZGV ESPN Radio 730 AM The Game, and the TuneIn Charlotte 49ers IMG Sports Network app. The radio announcers are "Voice of the 49ers" Matt Swierad with play-by-play, former Carolina Panther Kevin Donnalley with color commentary, and Bobby Rosinski with sideline reports. Swierad and Donnalley also host the "Gold Mine Live" Coaches Show each Monday during the season at noon from Norm's in the UNC Charlotte Student Union. "Gold Mine Live" can be heard on Mondays.

Preseason media poll
Conference USA released their preseason media poll on July 19, 2017, with the 49ers predicted to finish in last place in the East Division.

Game summaries

Eastern Michigan Eagles

Sources:

The 49ers were looking to avenge a home loss from the previous season as they visited the State of Michigan for the first time, but eleven costly penalties and three turnovers doomed the 49ers' efforts.

Top performers for the game were Eastern Michigan quarterback Brogan Roback, who passed for 267 yards and an interception. Charlotte quarterback Hasaan Klugh also was the top rusher of the game, with 14 carries for 101 yards in addition to passing for 114 yards, with a touchdown and an interception. Charlotte's Trent Bostick had 3 receptions for 34 yards and a touchdown.

Game notes:

 First game in the State of Michigan in program history.

Kansas State Wildcats

Sources:

Brad Lambert brought his 49ers into the State of Kansas for the first time to take on his Alma Mater. It would prove to be a long afternoon for the 49ers as the #19 team in the country put on a scoring clinic in front of the home crowd.

Top performers for the game were Kansas State quarterback Jesse Ertz, who passed for 178 yards. Kansas State rusher Alex Barnes had 16 carries for 99 yards and a touchdown. Kansas State's Isaiah Zuber had 7 receptions for 73 yards.

Game notes:

 First game in the State of Kansas in program history.
 First Big 12 opponent in program history.
 Lambert played four seasons as a defensive back for the Kansas State Wildcats, earning all Big 8 honors his senior season.

North Carolina A&T Aggies

Sources:

The 49ers opened the home slate with a game against in-state opponent N.C. A&T. The 49ers were favored to win but the Aggies got up on them early and held off a 4th quarter rally to win the game.

Top performers for the game were Charlotte quarterback Hassan Klugh, who passed for 170 yards, 3 touchdowns, and 2 interceptions. A&T rusher Marquell Cartwright had 17 carries for 66 yards and 2 touchdowns. Charlotte's Workpeh Kofa had 6 receptions for 110 yards and a touchdown.

Game notes:

First home loss to a FCS opponent since the program moved to FBS in 2015.

Georgia State Panthers

Sources:

In 2015, the 49ers played their first ever FBS game against the Panthers in the Georgia Dome, holding off a late Panthers' rally to mark the first FBS win in program history. The Panthers were looking to avenge that loss while the 49ers were looking to recover from a disappointing loss the previous week. The 49ers never found an offensive rhythm and failed to score during the game, recording the first team shutout in program history.

Georgia State also dominated the top performances of the game. Quarterback Conner Manning threw for 250 yards and a touchdown. Glenn Smith rushed for 90 yards on 31 carries, resulting in 2 touchdowns. Penny Hart had 11 receptions for 141 yards and a touchdown.

Game notes:

First team shutout in program history.
Post-game, Offensive Coordinator Jeff Mullen would be replaced in that position by Greg Adkins for the rest of the season.

FIU Panthers

Sources:

The Panthers ruined the 49ers' chance for their first ever Homecoming win when a late score gave them a one point victory. In their conference opener, the 49ers were looking for payback and would dominate the scoring into the second half, but would find the endzone elusive after that. FIU Would get within 2 points and take the go ahead field goal to make it a 1 point game and hold on to win.

Top performers of the game were Charlotte Quarterback Hasaan Klugh, who passed for 155 yards and a touchdown. Charlotte's Benny LeMay had 22 carries for 178 yards. Florida International's Trent Owens had 7 receptions for 101 yards and a touchdown.

Game notes:

49ers' second consecutive loss to FIU by 1 point.

Marshall Thundering Herd

Sources:

The 49ers stunned the Thundering Herd in 2016 by winning their first game ever played inside Joan C. Edwards Stadium. Marshall came into town looking for revenge and would find it in a defense struggle which saw the 49ers avoid a second program shutout on a fourth quarter field goal.

Top performances were all from Marshall in this game. Quarterback Chase Litton, who threw for 192 yards and two touchdowns. Rusher Keion Davis had 23 carries for 122 yards. Tyre Brady had 6 receptions for 88 yards and two touchdowns.

Game notes:

In 2016 Charlotte became the first team in Conference USA history to beat both Marshall and Southern Miss on the road in the same season.

Western Kentucky Hilltoppers

Sources:

Despite being in the same conference and same division for the two previous years, these two teams had yet to play each other before this game. Charlotte visited Bowling Green, Kentucky for the first time to face the two time defending Conference USA Football Champions on their home field. The game was competitive going into the 2nd quarter, but WKU would add two more touchdowns and a field goal before halftime. A final WKU touchdown early in the fourth quarter would be the final score of a resounding victory for the Hilltoppers.

Top performers of the game were Western Kentucky Quarterback Mike White, who passed for 398 yards and an impressive five touchdowns. Charlotte's Aaron McAllister had 22 carries for 157 yards and two touchdowns. The Hilltopper's Kylen Towner had 6 receptions for 111 yards and a touchdown.

Game notes:

First meeting of these two programs.
First time Charlotte faced a C-USA football champion.
Stretching back to the previous season the 49ers had the longest FBS losing streak at 10 games.

UAB Blazers

Sources:

After the drama that resulted in a two year hiatus from playing football, UAB was back on the gridiron and facing the 49ers for the first time. After a scoreless first quarter the Blazers took a two touchdown lead into the half. After the Blazers added a field goal early in the third quarter, they would not score again in regulation. Charlotte would do all the scoring left in regulation and tie the Blazers, forcing the 49ers' first overtime of the year. In the overtime period the Blazers would find the endzone first but the 49ers would match them. Seeking to get the program's first win of a frustrating year, Coach Lambert would go for two for the win; and after running in the matching touchdown Quarterback Hasaan Klugh would get the call again as he hauled in the game winning pass from Chris Montgomery to give the Niners' program its only win of the season and first ever Homecoming victory.

Top performers of the game were UAB Quarterback A. J. Erdely, who passed for 182 yards and a touchdown. Charlotte Quarterback Hasaan Klugh would be the team's top rusher with 25 carries for 1449ers yards and two touchdowns. The 49ers' Trent Bostick hauled in just 2 receptions which yielded an impressive 70 yards and a touchdown.

Game notes:

First meeting between these two conference mates
First Homecoming victory in program history.
The win broke Charlotte's FBS 10 game losing streak.

Old Dominion Monarchs

Sources:

The Monarchs rolled over the 49ers in Charlotte the previous season. Charlotte was looking to return the favor at Foreman Field, but both teams offenses struggled with neither ever finding the endzone. Unlike the 49ers, the Monarchs did find the goal posts, twice; to preserve the low score victory.

Top performers of the game were Old Dominion Quarterback Steven Williams, who passed for 153 yards. ODU's Ray Lawry had 25 carries for 98 yards. Charlotte's Mark Quattlebaum and ODU's Travis Fulgham had virtually identical stats with 4 receptions each with Fulgham having 1 yard more for 47 yards.

Game notes:

3rd straight loss to ODU.

Middle Tennessee Blue Raiders

Sources:

In 2016 Middle Tennessee pulled off a close win at Jerry Richardson Stadium. They had to return to Jerry Richardson Stadium for a second year in a row, but the 49ers couldn't get revenge or their first win against the Blue Raiders.

Top performers of the game were Middle Tennessee Quarterback Brent Stockstil, who passed for 255 yards and three touchdowns. The Blue Raiders' Tavares Thomas had 29 carries for 195 yards and two touchdowns. Charlotte's Mark Quattlebaum had 7 receptions for 94 yards and a touchdown.

Game notes:

Third consecutive loss to Middle Tennessee.

Southern Miss Golden Eagles

Sources:

The 49ers pulled off a shocking drubbing of the Golden Eagles on the road the previous season. Charlotte had to return to Hattiesburg for the second year in a row and it was clear by the midway point that the game's outcome wasn't in doubt, and that the Golden Eagles were looking to make a statement. Turnovers also proved detrimental to any 49er comeback attempt.

Southern Miss dominated the top performances. Quarterback Kwadra Griggs passed for 221 yards and a touchdown. Rusher Ito Smith had 15 carries for 153 yards and three touchdowns. The Golden Eagles Korey Robertson had 6 receptions for 91 yards and a touchdown. Charlotte quarterback Hasaan Klugh again was the 49ers' top rusher with 7 carries for 56 yards and a touchdown. He also had 96 passing yards for another touchdown and two interceptions.

Game notes:

In 2016 Charlotte became the first team in Conference USA history to beat both Marshall and Southern Miss on the road in the same season.

Florida Atlantic Owls

Sources:

Charlotte garnered their first ever C-USA win after a dramatic last second endzone catch was waved off for the Owls in Boca Raton the previous season. The Owls easily erased that mark on their record on their way to the 2018 C-USA Championship Game and their first C-USA title.

The eventual conference champions dominated the offensive stats. Quarterback Jason Driskel passed for 245 yards and two touchdowns. Rusher Devin Singletary had 108 yards and two touchdowns. Willie Wright had 9 receptions for 103 yards and a touchdown.

Game notes:

 First time Charlotte will host a final weekend regular season game in FBS.

Attendance

References

Charlotte
Charlotte 49ers football seasons
Charlotte 49ers football